Wadi al-Far'a is a Palestinian village in the Tubas Governorate in the northeastern West Bank located five kilometers southwest of Tubas. It has a land area of 12,000 dunams, of which 337 is built-up and 10,500 are for agricultural purposes. It is under the complete control of the Palestinian National Authority and is adjacent to the Far'a refugee camp. According to the Palestinian Central Bureau of Statistics, Wadi al-Far'a had a population of 2,340 inhabitants.

Archaeology
See Wadi al-Far'a (river)#Archaeology and Tirzah (ancient city)
For the nearby Heavy Neolithic archaeological sites of the Qaraoun culture (Wadi Farah, Shemouniyeh and Wadi Sallah) and for Tell el-Far'ah (North), the location of biblical Tirzah, see the above-mentioned links.

History

Wadi al-Far'a was historically known as Tarza'a and its current name comes from its geographic location, being near the Far'a spring. The village's land was previously owned by residents of nearby Talluza who used it as farmland. In the 1960s, residents from Talluza settled in the area and established a separate village. In 1996, Wadi al-Far'a was officially declared separate from Talluza and was granted its own village council under the Tubas Governorate.

Demographics
In the 1997 census by the Palestinian Central Bureau of Statistics, Wadi al-Far'a had a population of  1,713 inhabitants. Males constituted 51.3% and females constituted 49.7% of the population. In 2006, it grew to 2,341 rising by 32.5%. There are six main families in the village: al-Janajreh (30%), al-Barahameh (30%), as-Salahat (30%) the Darawhsheh, Shanableh and Balatya represent the remaining 10%.

See also
 Far'a refugee camp
 Ras al-Far'a town
 Wadi al-Far'a (river)

References

External links
Wadi al Far'a (Fact Sheet), Applied Research Institute–Jerusalem, ARIJ, February, 2006
Wadi al Far'a village profile, ARIJ

Villages in the West Bank
Municipalities of the State of Palestine